The 2019 EHF European Wheelchair Handball Nations’ Tournament was the 4th edition and was hosted for the first time in Croatia from 14 to 15 December 2019. This was the last European Wheelchair Handball Nations’ Tournament because next year will be held an official European championship. Croatia defeated Portugal to the first title.

Venues

Match officials

Draw
The draw was held at the EHF headquarters in Vienna on 26 November 2019. Spain was first planned as the sixth team but they withdrew from the tournament and Slovenia replaced them

Seeding
Croatia was allowed as host to pick their group.

Preliminary round
''All times are local (UTC+1)

Group A

Group B

Fifth place games

Knockout stage

Semifinals

Third place game

Final

Ranking and statistics

Final ranking

References

External links
Official website 

2019
International handball competitions hosted by Croatia
Sport in Zagreb
Handball Nations' Tournament
Handball
European Wheelchair Handball Nations' Tournament
European Wheelchair Handball Nations' Tournament